The 2009 Minnesota Twins season was the 49th season for the franchise in Minnesota, and the 109th overall in the American League. It was their final season at the Hubert H. Humphrey Metrodome with their new stadium, Target Field, opening in 2010. They ended the regular season as AL Central champions after defeating the Detroit Tigers in a one game tie-breaker. They were then swept in the American League Division Series by the New York Yankees. The team's star catcher and Minnesota native Joe Mauer won the American League Most Valuable Player Award.

Regular season 

On April 17, Jason Kubel hit for the cycle, becoming the ninth Twin to accomplish the feat. Kubel joins just six other American League cycle-hitters that filled the 'HR' slot with a grand slam home run.

On May 22, Michael Cuddyer hit for the cycle, becoming the tenth Twin to accomplish the feat. When he homered twice in the seventh inning on August 23, Cuddy became the only man ever in baseball to accomplish both feats in the same season. Prior to Kubel last month, the eight previous Twins' cycle hitters were Rod Carew, 1970; César Tovar, 1972; Larry Hisle, 1976; Lyman Bostock, 1976; Mike Cubbage, 1978; Gary Ward, 1980; Kirby Puckett, 1986 and Carlos Gómez, 2008.

After 319 consecutive games, Justin Morneau sat out June 21. He hadn't missed a game since June 27, 2007, until manager Ron Gardenhire held him out today. His consecutive-games streak remains the longest for the Twins club.

At the All-Star Game at Busch Stadium, Joe Mauer was the American League's starting catcher, and doubled in three at-bats. Justin Morneau and Joe Nathan entered as reserves. Nathan pitched an inning, walked one, struck out one and gave up one hit, earning a hold.

Joe Mauer won his third American League batting title, with a .365 average. In the forty-nine seasons the Minnesota Twins have existed, a Twin has won the AL batting title fourteen times -- Rod Carew (7), Tony Oliva (3), Joe Mauer (3) and Kirby Puckett (1).

Closer Joe Nathan saved 47 games to top Eddie Guardado's previous club record of 45. He was a co-winner of the Rolaids Relief Man Award (with Mariano Rivera), only the second Twin (after Bill Campbell, in 1976) to do so. Nathan now leads in Twins career saves with 260.

For the first time ever, four Twins topped 90 RBI: Jason Kubel (103), Justin Morneau (100), Joe Mauer (96) and Michael Cuddyer (94).

Along with winning the Gold Glove and Silver Slugger awards, Joe Mauer was named American League MVP, the fifth Twin in history to be so honored. Mauer is the first AL catcher to lead the league in batting average, slugging percentage and on-base percentage.

Season standings

Record vs. opponents

Roster

Game log 

|-  bgcolor="ffbbbb"
|- align="center" bgcolor="ffbbbb"
| 1 || April 6 || Mariners || 6–1 || Hernández (1–0) || Liriano (0–1) || || 48,514 || 0–1
|- align="center" bgcolor="bbffbb"
| 2 || April 7 || Mariners || 6–5 || Ayala (1–0) || Morrow (0–1) || || 23,755 || 1–1
|- align="center" bgcolor="bbffbb"
| 3 || April 8 || Mariners || 6–5 || Slowey (1–0) || Silva (0–1) || Nathan (1) || 22,270 || 2–1
|- align="center" bgcolor="ffbbbb"
| 4 || April 9 || Mariners || 2–0 || Washburn (1–0) || Perkins (0–1) || Morrow (1) || 20,105 || 2–2
|- align="center" bgcolor="bbffbb"
| 5 || April 10 || @ White Sox || 12–5 || Dickey (1–0) || Contreras (0–1) || || 25,422 || 3–2
|- align="center" bgcolor="ffbbbb"
| 6 || April 11 || @ White Sox || 8–0 || Colón (1–0) || Liriano (0–2) || || 33,935 || 3–3
|- align="center" bgcolor="ffbbbb"
| 7 || April 12 || @ White Sox || 6–1 || Buehrle (1–0) || Blackburn (0–1) || Jenks (2) || 25,571 || 3–4
|- align="center" bgcolor="ffbbbb"
| 8 || April 13 || Blue Jays || 8–6 || Frasor (1–0) || Ayala (1–1) || Ryan (1) || 16,410 || 3–5
|- align="center" bgcolor="bbffbb"
| 9 || April 14 || Blue Jays || 3 – 2 (11) || Crain (1–0) || Carlson (0–1) || || 15,375 || 4–5
|- align="center" bgcolor="ffbbbb"
| 10 || April 15 || Blue Jays || 12–2 || Richmond (1–0) || Baker (0–1) || || 19,471 || 4–6
|- align="center" bgcolor="ffbbbb"
| 11 || April 16 || Blue Jays || 9–2 || Halladay (3–0) || Liriano (0–3) || || 15,169 || 4–7
|- align="center" bgcolor="bbffbb"
| 12 || April 17 || Angels || 11–9 || Guerrier (1–0) || Bulger (0–1) || Nathan (2) || 24,168 || 5–7
|- align="center" bgcolor="bbffbb"
| 13 || April 18 || Angels || 9–2 || Slowey (2–0) || Jepsen (0–2) || || 34,286 || 6–7
|- align="center" bgcolor="bbffbb"
| 14 || April 19 || Angels || 3–1 || Perkins (1–1) || Loux (0–1) || Nathan (3) || 28,302 || 7–7
|- align="center" bgcolor="bbbbbb"
| || April 21  || @ Red Sox || colspan=6 |Postponed (rain); rescheduled for April 22
|- align="center" bgcolor="ffbbbb"
| 15 || April 22 || @ Red Sox || 10 – 1 (7) || Wakefield (2–1) || Baker (0–2) || || 37,608 || 7–8
|- align="center" bgcolor="ffbbbb"
| 16 || April 22 || @ Red Sox || 7–3 || Penny (2–0) || Liriano (0–4) || || 37,494 || 7–9
|- align="center" bgcolor="bbffbb"
| 17 || April 24 || @ Indians || 5–1 || Blackburn (1–1) || Carmona (1–3) || || 20,215 || 8–9
|- align="center" bgcolor="bbffbb"
| 18 || April 25 || @ Indians || 7–1 || Slowey (3–0) || Pavano (0–3) || || 23,186 || 9–9
|- align="center" bgcolor="ffbbbb"
| 19 || April 26 || @ Indians || 4–2 || Laffey (2–0) || Perkins (1–2) || Wood (4) || 20,153 || 9–10
|- align="center" bgcolor="ffbbbb"
| 20 || April 27 || Rays || 7–1 || Niemann (2–2) || Baker (0–3) || || 17,988 || 9–11
|- align="center" bgcolor="bbffbb"
| 21 || April 28 || Rays || 4–3 || Nathan (1–0) || Howell (0–2) || || 18,974 || 10–11
|- align="center" bgcolor="bbffbb"
| 22 || April 29 || Rays || 8–3 || Blackburn (2–1) || Kazmir (3–2) || || 21,715 || 11–11
|-

|-  bgcolor="ffbbbb"
|- align="center" bgcolor="bbffbb"
| 23 || May 1 || Royals || 7–5 || Slowey (4–0) || Ponson (0–4) || Nathan (4) || 24,727 || 12–11
|- align="center" bgcolor="ffbbbb"
| 24 || May 2 || Royals || 10 – 7 (11) || Soria (1–0) || Breslow (0–1) || || 29,061 || 12–12
|- align="center" bgcolor="ffbbbb"
| 25 || May 3 || Royals || 7–5 || Meche (2–2) || Baker (0–4) || Soria (6) || 31,845 || 12–13
|- align="center" bgcolor="bbffbb"
| 26 || May 4 || @ Tigers || 7–2 || Liriano (1–4) || Jackson (1–2) || || 21,298 || 13–13
|- align="center" bgcolor="ffbbbb"
| 27 || May 5 || @ Tigers || 9–0 || Porcello (2–3) || Blackburn (2–2) || || 23,754 || 13–14
|- align="center" bgcolor="ffbbbb"
| 28 || May 6 || @ Orioles || 4 – 1 (6) || Bass (1–1) || Slowey (4–1) || || 10,566 || 13–15
|- align="center" bgcolor="ffbbbb"
| 29 || May 7 || @ Orioles || 5–4 || Johnson (2–0) || Mijares (0–1) || Sherrill (5) || 11,399 || 13–16
|- align="center" bgcolor="bbffbb"
| 30 || May 8 || Mariners || 11–0 || Baker (1–4) || Jakubauskas (1–4) || || 29,714 || 14–16
|- align="center" bgcolor="bbffbb"
| 31 || May 9 || Mariners || 9–6 || Liriano (2–4) || Hernández (4–2) || Nathan (5) || 29,552 || 15–16
|- align="center" bgcolor="ffbbbb"
| 32 || May 10 || Mariners || 5–3 || Batista (2–0) || Crain (1–1) || Morrow (6) || 25,555 || 15–17
|- align="center" bgcolor="bbffbb"
| 33 || May 12 || Tigers || 6–2 || Slowey (5–1) || Galarraga (3–3) || || 24,807 || 16–17
|- align="center" bgcolor="bbffbb"
| 34 || May 13 || Tigers || 14 – 10 (13) || Crain (2–1) || Lyon (1–3) || || 22,178 || 17–17
|- align="center" bgcolor="bbffbb"
| 35 || May 14 || Tigers || 6–5 || Breslow (1–1) || Seay (0–1) || Nathan (6) || 26,046 || 18–17
|- align="center" bgcolor="ffbbbb"
| 36 || May 15 || @ Yankees || 5–4 || Veras (2–1) || Nathan (1–1) || || 43,856 || 18–18
|- align="center" bgcolor="ffbbbb"
| 37 || May 16 || @ Yankees || 6 – 4 (11) || Aceves (1–0) || Breslow (1–2) || || 45,455 || 18–19
|- align="center" bgcolor="ffbbbb"
| 38 || May 17 || @ Yankees || 3 – 2 (10) || Aceves (2–0) || Crain (2–2) || || 44,804 || 18–20
|- align="center" bgcolor="ffbbbb"
| 39 || May 18 || @ Yankees || 7–6 || Pettitte (4–1) || Perkins (1–3) || Coke (1) || 43,244 || 18–21
|- align="center" bgcolor="ffbbbb"
| 40 || May 19 || @ White Sox || 6–2 || Buehrle (6–1) || Baker (1–5) || || 26,696 || 18–22
|- align="center" bgcolor="ffbbbb"
| 41 || May 20 || @ White Sox || 7–4 || Danks (3–3) || Liriano (2–5) || Jenks (9) || 29,044 || 18–23
|- align="center" bgcolor="bbffbb"
| 42 || May 21 || @ White Sox || 20–1 || Blackburn (3–2) || Colón (2–4) || || 23,048 || 19–23
|- align="center" bgcolor="bbffbb"
| 43 || May 22 || Brewers || 11–3 || Slowey (6–1) || Parra (3–5) || || 30,297 || 20–23
|- align="center" bgcolor="bbffbb"
| 44 || May 23 || Brewers || 6–2 || Swarzak (1–0) || Looper (4–3) || || 40,547 || 21–23
|- align="center" bgcolor="bbffbb"
| 45 || May 24 || Brewers || 6–3 || Baker (2–5) || Bush (3–1) || || 38,959 || 22–23
|- align="center" bgcolor="ffbbbb"
| 46 || May 25 || Red Sox || 6–5 || Penny (5–1) || Liriano (2–6) || Papelbon (12) || 27,636 || 22–24
|- align="center" bgcolor="bbffbb"
| 47 || May 26 || Red Sox || 5–2 || Blackburn (4–2) || Lester (3–5) || Nathan (7) || 20,019 || 23–24
|- align="center" bgcolor="bbffbb"
| 48 || May 27 || Red Sox || 4–2 || Slowey (7–1) || Matsuzaka (0–3) || Nathan (8) || 28,221 || 24–24
|- align="center" bgcolor="ffbbbb"
| 49 || May 28 || Red Sox || 3–1 || Beckett (5–2) || Swarzak (1–1) || Papelbon (13) || 23,958 || 24–25
|- align="center" bgcolor="ffbbbb"
| 50 || May 29 || @ Rays || 5–3 || Shields (4–4) || Baker (2–6) || Choate (1) || 19,358 || 24–26
|- align="center" bgcolor="ffbbbb"
| 51 || May 30 || @ Rays || 5–2 || Price (1–0) || Liriano (2–7) || Choate (2) || 36,052 || 24–27
|- align="center" bgcolor="bbffbb"
| 52 || May 31 || @ Rays || 3–2 || Blackburn (5–2) || Garza (4–4) || Nathan (9) || 26,579 || 25–27
|-

|-  bgcolor="ffbbbb"
|- align="center" bgcolor="bbffbb"
| 53 || June 2 || Indians || 4–3 || Slowey (8–1) || Huff (0–2) || Nathan (10) || 26,530 || 26–27
|- align="center" bgcolor="ffbbbb"
| 54 || June 3 || Indians || 10–1 || Lee (3–6) || Swarzak (1–2) || || 29,336 || 26–28
|- align="center" bgcolor="bbffbb"
| 55 || June 4 || Indians || 11–3 || Baker (3–6) || Carmona (2–6) || || 20,897 || 27–28
|- align="center" bgcolor="bbffbb"
| 56 || June 5 || @ Mariners || 2 – 1 (10) || Guerrier (2–0) || Lowe (0–3) || Nathan (11) || 35,808 || 28–28
|- align="center" bgcolor="ffbbbb"
| 57 || June 6 || @ Mariners || 2–1 || Jakubauskas (4–5) || Henn (0–1) || Aardsma (9) || 30,600 || 28–29
|- align="center" bgcolor="ffbbbb"
| 58 || June 7 || @ Mariners || 4–2 || Bédard (5–2) || Slowey (8–2) || White (1) || 37,714 || 28–30
|- align="center" bgcolor="ffbbbb"
| 59 || June 8 || @ Athletics || 4–3 || Outman (4–0) || Ayala (1–2) || Bailey (5) || 10,181 || 28–31
|- align="center" bgcolor="bbffbb"
| 60 || June 9 || @ Athletics || 10–5 || Baker (4–6) || Anderson (3–6) || Nathan (12) || 10,127 || 29–31
|- align="center" bgcolor="bbffbb"
| 61 || June 10 || @ Athletics || 6–3 || Guerrier (3–0) || Bailey (4–1) || Nathan (13) || 18,074 || 30–31
|- align="center" bgcolor="ffbbbb"
| 62 || June 11 || @ Athletics || 4–3 || Ziegler (1–1) || Henn (0–2) || || 13,383 || 30–32
|- align="center" bgcolor="bbffbb"
| 63 || June 12 || @ Cubs || 7–4 || Slowey (9–2) || Wells (0–3) || Nathan (14) || 41,509 || 31–32
|- align="center" bgcolor="bbffbb"
| 64 || June 13 || @ Cubs || 2–0 || Swarzak (2–2) || Harden (4–3) || Nathan (15) || 40,899 || 32–32
|- align="center" bgcolor="ffbbbb"
| 65 || June 14 || @ Cubs || 3–2 || Mármol (2–1) || Crain (2–3) || || 40,814 || 32–33
|- align="center" bgcolor="bbffbb"
| 66 || June 16 || Pirates || 8–2 || Perkins (2–3) || Maholm (4–3) || || 25,351 || 33–33
|- align="center" bgcolor="ffbbbb"
| 67 || June 17 || Pirates || 8–2 || Snell (2–7) || Liriano (2–8) || || 30,057 || 33–34
|- align="center" bgcolor="bbffbb"
| 68 || June 18 || Pirates || 5–1 || Blackburn (6–2) || Duke (7–5) || || 30,670 || 34–34
|- align="center" bgcolor="bbffbb"
| 69 || June 19 || Astros || 5–2 || Slowey (10–2) || Oswalt (3–4) || Nathan (16) || 32,218 || 35–34
|- align="center" bgcolor="ffbbbb"
| 70 || June 20 || Astros || 6–5 || Moehler (4–4) || Henn (0–3) || Valverde (4) || 34,710 || 35–35
|- align="center" bgcolor="ffbbbb"
| 71 || June 21 || Astros || 5–1 || Rodríguez (6–6) || Perkins (2–4) || Valverde (5) || 39,659 || 35–36
|- align="center" bgcolor="bbffbb"
| 72 || June 23 || @ Brewers || 7–3  || Liriano (3–8) || Suppan (5–5) || || 42,008 || 36–36
|- align="center" bgcolor="ffbbbb"
| 73 || June 24 || @ Brewers || 4–3 || Coffey (3–1) || Blackburn (6–3) || Hoffman (17) || 34,480  || 36–37 
|- align="center" bgcolor="bbffbb"
| 74 || June 25 || @ Brewers || 6–4 || Baker (5–6) || Burns (0–1) || Nathan (17) || 40,524 || 37–37
|- align="center" bgcolor="bbffbb"
| 75 || June 26 || @ Cardinals || 3–1 || Perkins (3–4) || Wainwright (8–5) || Nathan (18) || 44,159 || 38–37
|- align="center" bgcolor="ffbbbb"
| 76 || June 27 || @ Cardinals || 5–3 || Kinney (1–0) || Slowey (10–3) || Franklin (18) || 42,986 || 38–38
|- align="center" bgcolor="bbffbb"
| 77 || June 28 || @ Cardinals || 6–2 || Liriano (4–8) || Piñeiro (6–9) || Nathan (19) || 42,705 || 39–38
|- align="center" bgcolor="ffbbbb"
| 78 || June 29 || @ Royals || 4–2 || Hochevar (3–3) || Blackburn (6–4) || Soria (10) || 22,066 || 39–39
|- align="center" bgcolor="bbffbb"
| 79 || June 30 || @ Royals || 2–1 || Baker (6–6) || Bannister (5–6) || Nathan (20) || 19,310 || 40–39
|-

|-  bgcolor="ffbbbb"
|- align="center" bgcolor="bbffbb"
| 80 || July 1 || @ Royals || 5–1 || Perkins (4–4) || Meche (4–8) || Nathan (21) || 18,906 || 41–39
|- align="center" bgcolor="ffbbbb"
| 81 || July 3 || Tigers || 11 – 9 (16) || Dolsi (1–0) || Dickey (1–1) || || 33,368 || 41–40
|- align="center"  bgcolor="bbffbb"
| 82 || July 4 || Tigers || 4–3 || Guerrier (4–0)  || Lyon (3–4)  ||Nathan (22) || 27,238  || 42–40 
|- align="center" bgcolor="bbffbb"
| 83 || July 5 || Tigers || 6–2  ||Blackburn (7–4)  ||Porcello (8–6)  || || 33,274  ||43–40 
|- align="center" bgcolor="ffbbbb"
| 84 || July 7 || Yankees || 10–2 || Sabathia (8–5)  ||Baker (6–7)  || ||29,540  || 43–41 
|- align="center" bgcolor="ffbbbb"
| 85 || July 8 || Yankees || 4–3 || Burnett (8–4) ||Swarzak (2–3)  ||Rivera (22) || 38,115  || 43–42 
|- align="center" bgcolor="ffbbbb"
| 86 || July 9 || Yankees || 6–4  ||Albaladejo (4–1)  ||Liriano (4–9)  ||Rivera (23) || 29,628  || 43–43 
|- align="center" bgcolor="bbffbb"
| 87 || July 10 || White Sox || 6–4 ||Blackburn (8–4)  || Dotel (1–3)  ||Nathan (23) || 29,628 || 44–43 
|- align="center" bgcolor="ffbbbb"
| 88 || July 11 || White Sox || 8–7  || Floyd (7–6) ||Perkins (4–5)  ||Jenks (20) || 41,146  || 44–44
|- align="center" bgcolor="bbffbb"
| 89 || July 12 || White Sox || 13–7  ||Baker (7–7)  ||Buehrle (9–3)  || || 36,254 || 45–44 
|- align="center" bgcolor="bbffbb"
| 90 || July 17 || @ Rangers || 5–3 || Perkins (5–5) || Padilla (7–5) || Nathan (24) || 34,662 || 46–44 
|- align="center" bgcolor="bbffbb"
| 91 || July 18 || @ Rangers || 4–1 || Baker (8–7) || Feldman (8–3) || Nathan (25) || 31,041 || 47–44 
|- align="center" bgcolor="ffbbbb"
| 92 || July 19 || @ Rangers || 5 – 3 (12) || Nippert (1–0) || Duensing (0–1) || || 27,204 || 47–45 
|- align="center" bgcolor="ffbbbb"
| 93 || July 20 || @ Athletics || 14–13 || Breslow (3–4) || Mijares (0–2) || Wuertz (3) || 10,283 || 47–46
|- align="center" bgcolor="bbffbb"
| 94 || July 21 || @ Athletics || 3 – 2 (10)  || Guerrier (5–0) || Bailey (4–3) || Nathan (26) || 12,027 || 48–46 
|- align="center" bgcolor="ffbbbb"
| 95 || July 22 || @ Athletics || 16–1 || Cahill (6–8) || Perkins (5–6) || || 22,031 || 48–47
|- align="center" bgcolor="ffbbbb"
| 96 || July 23 || @ Angels || 6 – 5 (10)  || Fuentes (1–2) || Crain (2–4) || || 38,145 || 48–48
|- align="center" bgcolor="ffbbbb"
| 97 || July 24 || @ Angels || 6–3 || Lackey (6–4) || Liriano (4–10) || || 39,272 || 48–49 
|- align="center" bgcolor="ffbbbb"
| 98 || July 25 || @ Angels || 11–5 || Palmer (8–1) || Blackburn (8–5) || || 35,922 || 48–50 
|- align="center" bgcolor="bbffbb"
| 99 || July 26 || @ Angels || 10–1 || Swarzak (3–3) || Santana (3–6) || || 36,386 || 49–50 
|- align="center" bgcolor="bbffbb"
| 100 || July 27 || White Sox || 4–3 || Perkins (6–6) || Danks (8–7) ||Nathan (27) || 32,354 || 50–50 
|- align="center" bgcolor="bbffbb"
| 101 || July 28 || White Sox || 5–3 || Mijares (1–2) || Beuhrle (11–4) || Nathan (28) || 34,642 || 51–50 
|- align="center" bgcolor="bbffbb"
| 102 || July 29 || White Sox || 3–2 || Crain (3–4) || Contreras (4–10) || Nathan (29) || 39,002 || 52–50
|- align="center" bgcolor="ffbbbb"
| 103 || July 31 || Angels || 11 – 5 (11) || Jepsen (3–2) || Keppel (0–1) || || 31,767 || 52–51
|-

|-  bgcolor="ffbbbb"
|- align="center" bgcolor="ffbbbb"
| 104 || August 1 || Angels || 11–6 || Saunders (9–6) || Swarzak (3–4) || || 40,828 || 52–52 
|- align="center" bgcolor="ffbbbb"
| 105 || August 2 || Angels || 13–4 || Weaver (11–3) || Perkins (6–7) || || 41,079 || 52–53 
|- align="center" bgcolor="bbffbb"
| 106 || August 4 || @ Indians || 10–1 || Baker (9–7) || Huff (5–6) || || 17,518 || 53–53 
|- align="center" bgcolor="ffbbbb" 
| 107 || August 5 || @ Indians || 8–1  || Laffey (5–3)  || Liriano (4–11)  || ||  17,683  || 53–54
|- align="center" bgcolor="ffbbbb" 
| 108 || August 6 || @ Indians || 2–1  || Sipp (2–0)  || Blackburn (8–6)  || Wood (15) || 21,657  || 53–55
|- align="center" bgcolor="ffbbbb"
| 109 || August 7 || @ Tigers || 10–8  || Galarraga (6–10)  || Swarzak (3–5)  || || 36,444  || 53–56
|- align="center" bgcolor="bbffbb"
| 110 || August 8 || @ Tigers || 11–0  || Pavano (10–8)  || Verlander (12–6)  || || 39,685  || 54–56
|- align="center" bgcolor="ffbbbb"
| 111 || August 9 || @ Tigers || 8–7  || Lyon (5–4)  || Guerrier (5–1)  || Rodney (23) || 35,423  || 54–57
|- align="center" bgcolor="ffbbbb"
| 112 || August 11 || Royals || 14–6  || Davies (4–8) || Blackburn (8–7) || || 32,121 || 54–58 
|- align="center" bgcolor="bbffbb" 
| 113 || August 12 || Royals || 7–1 || Liriano (5–11)  || Bannister (7–9) || || 30,105  || 55–58
|- align="center" bgcolor="ffbbbb" 
| 114 || August 13 || Royals || 5–4   || Meche (5–9) || Pavano (10–9)  || Soria (19) || 32,373  || 55–59
|- align="center" bgcolor="bbffbb"
| 115 || August 14 || Indians || 11–0 || Baker (10–7) || Masterson (3–4) || || 34,845 || 56–59
|- align="center" bgcolor="ffbbbb"
| 116 || August 15 || Indians || 7–3 || Huff (7–6) || Swarzak (3–6) || || 33,931 || 56–60 
|- align="center" bgcolor="ffbbbb"
| 117 || August 16 || Indians || 7–4 || Laffey (7–3) || Blackburn (8–8) || || 30,260 || 56–61 
|- align="center" bgcolor="ffbbbb"
| 118 || August 17 || @ Rangers || 8–5 || Hunter (6–2) || Liriano (5–12) || Francisco (18) || 17,940 || 56–62 
|- align="center" bgcolor="bbffbb"
| 119 || August 18 || @ Rangers || 9–6 || Crain (4–4) || Jennings (2–4) || Nathan (30) || 20,931 || 57–62 
|- align="center" bgcolor="bbffbb"
| 120 || August 19 || @ Rangers || 5–4 || Baker (11–7) || Millwood (9–8) || Nathan (31) || 33,479 || 58–62 
|- align="center" bgcolor="ffbbbb"
| 121 || August 20 || @ Rangers || 11–1 || Holland (7–7) || Swarzak (3–7) || || 21,870 || 58–63 
|- align="center" bgcolor="bbffbb"
| 122 || August 21 || @ Royals || 5–4 || Nathan (2–1) || Soria (3–1) || || 22,283 || 59–63
|- align="center" bgcolor="bbffbb"
| 123 || August 22 || @ Royals || 8–7 || Duensing (1–1) || Davies (4–9) || Guerrier (1) || 33,811 || 60–63
|- align="center" bgcolor="bbffbb"
| 124 || August 23 || @ Royals || 10–3 || Pavano (11–9) || Bannister (7–10) || || 18,680 || 61–63
|- align="center" bgcolor="bbffbb"
| 125 || August 24 || Orioles || 2–1 || Baker (12–7) || Tillman (1–2) || Nathan (32) || 20,271 || 62–63
|- align="center" bgcolor="bbffbb"
| 126 || August 25 || Orioles || 7–6 || Mijares (2–2) || Mickolio (0–1) || || 23,696 || 63–63
|- align="center" bgcolor="ffbbbb"
| 127 || August 26 || Orioles || 5–1 || Guthrie (9–12) || Blackburn (8–9) || || 28,446 || 63–64 
|- align="center" bgcolor="bbffbb"
| 128 || August 28 || Rangers || 3–2 || Duensing (2–1) || Hunter (6–3) || Nathan (33) || 21,641 || 64–64  
|- align="center" bgcolor="ffbbbb"
| 129 || August 29 || Rangers || 3–0 || Feldman (14–4) || Pavano (11–10) || Francisco (19) || 28,516 || 64–65 
|- align="center" bgcolor="bbffbb"
| 130 || August 30 || Rangers || 5–3 || Rauch (1–0) || Wilson (4–6) || Nathan (34) || 29,282 || 65–65 
|- align="center" bgcolor="bbffbb"
| 131 || August 31 || White Sox || 4–1 || Blackburn (9–9) || Floyd (10–9) || Nathan (35) || 19,426 || 66–65
|-

|-  bgcolor="ffbbbb"
|- align="center" bgcolor="bbffbb"
| 132 || September 1 || White Sox || 4–3 || Rauch (2–0) || Thornton (6–3) || || 22,599 || 67–65
|- align="center" bgcolor="ffbbbb"
| 133 || September 2 || White Sox || 4–2 || Carrasco (5–1) || Nathan (2–2) || Jenks (28) || 21,007 || 67–66
|- align="center" bgcolor="ffbbbb"
| 134 || September 4 || @ Indians || 5–2 || Sowers (6–9) || Pavano (10–11) || Wood (18) || 24,402 || 67–67
|- align="center" bgcolor="bbffbb"
| 135 || September 5 || @ Indians || 4–1 || Baker (13–7) || Masterson (4–7) || Nathan (36) || 19,455 || 68–67
|- align="center" bgcolor="ffbbbb"
| 136 || September 6 || @ Indians || 3–1 || Huff (9–7) || Blackburn (9–10) || Wood (19) || 17,911 || 68–68
|- align="center" bgcolor="bbffbb"
| 137 || September 7 || @ Blue Jays || 6–3 || Crain (5–4) || Richmond (6–9) || Nathan (37) || 13,153 || 69–68
|- align="center" bgcolor="ffbbbb"
| 138 || September 8 || @ Blue Jays || 6–3 || Romero (12–7) || Rauch (2–1) || Frasor (7) || 13,488 || 69–69
|- align="center" bgcolor="bbffbb"
| 139 || September 9 || @ Blue Jays || 4–1 || Pavano (12–11) || Halladay (13–9) || Nathan (38) || 11,159 || 70–69
|- align="center" bgcolor="ffbbbb"
| 140 || September 10 || @ Blue Jays || 3–2 || Cecil (7–4) || Baker (13–8) || Frasor (8) || 11,461 || 70–70
|- align="center" bgcolor="ffbbbb"
| 141 || September 11 || Athletics || 12–5 || Mortensen (1–2) || Blackburn (9–11) || || 21,084 || 70–71
|- align="center" bgcolor="ffbbbb"
| 142 || September 12 || Athletics || 4–2 || Anderson (9–10) || Manship (0–1) || Bailey (24) || 24,283 || 70–72
|- align="center" bgcolor="bbffbb"
| 143 || September 13 || Athletics || 8–0 || Duensing (3–1) || Gonzalez (5–6) || || 21,850 || 71–72
|- align="center" bgcolor="bbffbb"
| 144 || September 14 || Indians || 6–3 || Mahay (2–1) || C. Perez (0–1) || Nathan (39) || 20,640 || 72–72 
|- align="center" bgcolor="bbffbb"
| 145 || September 15 || Indians || 5–4 || Rauch (3–1) || Carmona (3–11) || Nathan (40) || 19,035 || 73–72
|- align="center" bgcolor="bbffbb"
| 146 || September 16 || Indians || 7–3 || Blackburn (10–11) || Laffey (7–6) || Nathan (41) || 16,921 || 74–72
|- align="center" bgcolor="bbffbb"
| 147 || September 18 || Tigers || 3–0 || Duensing (4–1) || Porcello (13–9) || Nathan (42)|| 32,693 || 75–72
|- align="center" bgcolor="bbffbb"
| 148 || September 19 || Tigers || 6–2 || Crain (6–4) || Verlander (16–9) || || 43,338 || 76–72 
|- align="center" bgcolor="ffbbbb"
| 149 || September 20 || Tigers || 6–2 || Robertson (2–2) || Baker (13–9) || || 36,335 || 76–73
|- align="center" bgcolor="bbffbb"
| 150 || September 21 || @ White Sox || 7–0 || Blackburn (11–11) || Hudson (0–1) || || 26,541 || 77–73
|- align="center" bgcolor="bbffbb"
| 151 || September 22 || @ White Sox || 8–6 || Crain (7–4) || Danks (12–10) || Nathan (43) || 25,290 || 78–73
|- align="center" bgcolor="bbffbb"
| 152 || September 23 || @ White Sox || 8–6 || Duensing (5–1)  || Buehrle (12–10) || Nathan (44) || 26,097 || 79–73
|- align="center" bgcolor="bbffbb"
| 153 || September 25 || @ Royals || 9–4 || Pavano (13–11) || Tejeda (4–2) || || 23,307 || 80–73
|- align="center" bgcolor="bbffbb"
| 154 || September 26 || @ Royals || 11–6 || Baker (14–9) || DiNardo (0–2) || || 30,690 || 81–73
|- align="center" bgcolor="ffbbbb"
| 155 || September 27 || @ Royals || 4–1 || Greinke (16–8) || Liriano (5–13) || Soria (29) || 28,721 || 81–74
|- align="center" bgcolor="bbbbbb"
| || September 28  || @ Tigers || colspan=6 |Postponed (rain); rescheduled for September 29
|- align="center" bgcolor="bbffbb"
| 156 || September 29 || @ Tigers || 3–2 || Rauch (4–1) || Lyon (6–5) || Nathan (45) || 35,243 || 82–74 
|- align="center" bgcolor="ffbbbb"
| 157 || September 29 || @ Tigers || 6–5 || Verlander (18–9) || Duensing (5–2) || Rodney (36) || 30,240 || 82–75
|- align="center" bgcolor="ffbbbb"
| 158 || September 30 || @ Tigers || 7–2 || Bonine (1–1) || Pavano (13–12) || || 34,775 || 82–76
|-

|-  bgcolor="ffbbbb"
|- align="center" bgcolor="bbffbb"
| 159 || October 1 || @ Tigers || 8–3 || Baker (15–9) || Robertson (2–3) || || 40,533 || 83–76
|- align="center" bgcolor="bbffbb"
| 160 || October 2 || Royals || 10–7 || Manship (1–1) || DiNardo (0–3) || Nathan (46) || 40,223 || 84–76
|- align="center" bgcolor="bbffbb"
| 161 || October 3 || Royals || 5–4 || Rauch (5–1) || Hughes (0–2) || Nathan (47) || 48,644 || 85–76
|- align="center" bgcolor="bbffbb"
| 162 || October 4 || Royals || 13–4 || Pavano (14–12) || Hochevar (7–13) || || 51,155 || 86–76
|- align="center" bgcolor="bbffbb"
| 163 || October 6 || Tigers* || 6 – 5 (12) || Keppel (1–1)|| Rodney (2–5) || || 54,088 || 87–76
|-
| colspan=9 | *AL Central tiebreaker.
|-

|-  bgcolor="ffbbbb"
|- align="center" bgcolor="ffbbbb"
| 1 || October 7 || @ Yankees || 7–2 || Sabathia (1–0) || Duensing (0–1) || || 49,484 || 0–1
|-
|- align="center" bgcolor="ffbbbb"
| 2	|| October 9 || @ Yankees || 4 – 3 (12) || Robertson (1–0) || Mijares (0–1) || || 50,006 || 0–2
|-
|- align="center" bgcolor="ffbbbb"
| 3 || October 11 || Yankees || 4–1 || Pettitte (1–0) || Pavano (0–1) || Rivera (1) || 54,735 || 0–3
|-

Tie-Breaker & Post Season 

The Twins ended the 162-game regular season tied with the Detroit Tigers, necessitating a one-game playoff. This made the Twins the first major league team ever to play in a tie-breaker two years in a row (they lost one to the Chicago White Sox in 2008). The game took place on Tuesday, October 6 at the Metrodome. The Twins won the game, 6-5, in 12 innings on Alexi Casilla's game-winning hit scoring Carlos Gómez.

The Twins went on to face the New York Yankees in the American League Division Series, which they lost in three consecutive games.

Player stats

Batting

Regular season 
Note: G = Games played; AB = At bats; R = Runs scored; H = Hits; 2B = Doubles; 3B = Triples; HR = Home runs; RBI = Runs batted in; AVG = Batting average; SB = Stolen bases

Postseason 
Note: G = Games played; AB = At bats; R = Runs scored; H = Hits; 2B = Doubles; 3B = Triples; HR = Home runs; RBI = Runs batted in; AVG = Batting average; SB = Stolen bases

Pitching

Regular season 
Note: W = Wins; L = Losses; ERA = Earned run average; G = Games pitched; GS = Games started; SV = Saves; IP = Innings pitched; R = Runs allowed; ER = Earned runs allowed; BB = Walks allowed; K = Strikeouts

Postseason 
Note: W = Wins; L = Losses; ERA = Earned run average; G = Games pitched; GS = Games started; SV = Saves; IP = Innings pitched; R = Runs allowed; ER = Earned runs allowed; BB = Walks allowed; K = Strikeouts

Other post-season awards 
 Calvin R. Griffith Award (Most Valuable Twin) – Joe Mauer
 Joseph W. Haynes Award (Twins Pitcher of the Year) – Joe Nathan
 Bill Boni Award (Twins Outstanding Rookie) – José Mijares
 Charles O. Johnson Award (Most Improved Twin) – Michael Cuddyer
 Dick Siebert Award (Upper Midwest Player of the Year) – Joe Mauer
 Bob Allison Award (Leadership Award) – Michael Cuddyer
 Mike Augustin Award ("Media Good Guy" Award) – Denard Span
 The above awards are voted on by the Twin Cities chapter of the BBWAA
 Carl R. Pohlad Award (Outstanding Community Service) – Justin Morneau
 Sherry Robertson Award (Twins Outstanding Farm System Position Player) – Ben Revere
 Jim Rantz Award (Twins Outstanding Farm System Pitcher) – David Bromberg
 Kirby Puckett Award (Alumni Community Service) – Rod Carew
 Herb Carneal Award (Lifetime Achievement Award) – Jerry Bell

Farm system

References 

 2009 Minnesota Twins season at Baseball Reference
 2009 Minnesota Twins season Official Site (Archived 2009-07-31)

Minnesota Twins seasons
American League Central champion seasons
Minnesota Twins
2009 in sports in Minnesota